The 1964–65 Rugby Football League season was the 70th season of rugby league football.

Rule change
 Substitutes were introduced. They were initially only for players injured in the time up to and including half time.

Season summary
1964-65 saw the two divisions of rugby league merge back into one single league. The championship play-offs returned to decide the champions. A new top 16 play-off format was introduced rather than top four system used between 1905–06 and 1962–63. A Bottom 14 Championship was also introduced for the remaining clubs who finished below the top 16, although some clubs declined to take part.

St. Helens had finished the regular season as league leaders. Halifax won their third Championship when they beat St. Helens 15-7 in the play-off final. Terry Fogerty was awarded the Harry Sunderland Trophy as man-of-the-match.

Challenge Cup winners were Wigan who beat Hunslet 20-16 in the final.

Bradford Northern are resurrected and accepted back into the League.

St. Helens won the Lancashire League, and Castleford won the Yorkshire League. St. Helens beat Swinton 12–4 to win the Lancashire County Cup, and Wakefield Trinity beat Leeds 18–2 to win the Yorkshire County Cup.

Championship

Play-offs

Challenge Cup

Captain-coached by Eric Ashton, Wigan beat Hunslet 20-16 in the final played at Wembley in front of a crowd of 89,016.

This was Wigan’s seventh Cup Final win in thirteen Final appearances.

To date, this was Hunslet’s last Challenge Cup Final appearance.

References

Sources
1964-65 Rugby Football League season at wigan.rlfans.com
The Challenge Cup at The Rugby Football League website

1964 in English rugby league
1965 in English rugby league
Northern Rugby Football League seasons